Theresa E. "Terry" DeWitt (born 15 April 1963 in Fort Bragg, North Carolina) is an American former sport shooter who competed in the 1996 Summer Olympics.

References

1963 births
Living people
American female sport shooters
Trap and double trap shooters
Olympic shooters of the United States
Shooters at the 1996 Summer Olympics
People from Fort Bragg, North Carolina
21st-century American women
20th-century American women